Caithness Energy, LLC is an independent power producer in the United States.  Some of its planned, current, and former facilities include:

 Guernsey Power Station
 Caithness Long Island Energy Center
 Shepherds Flat Wind Farm
 Coso Geothermal Power Project
 Geothermal system at Beowawe

References

Energy companies of the United States